Benperidol, sold under the trade name Anquil among others, is a typical antipsychotic primarily used to treat hypersexuality syndromes and can be used to treat schizophrenia. It is a highly potent butyrophenone derivative and is the most potent neuroleptic on the European market, with chlorpromazine equivalency as high as 75 to 100 (about 150 to 200% the potency, per dose, of haloperidol). It is sometimes prescribed to sex offenders as a condition of their parole, as an alternative to anti-androgen drugs such as cyproterone acetate.

Benperidol was discovered by Janssen Pharmaceutica in 1961 and has been marketed since 1966. It is mainly used in Germany, but it is also available in Belgium, Greece, Italy, the Netherlands, and the United Kingdom.

Pharmacology

Pharmacodynamics 
Benperidol is a strong dopamine receptor antagonist (D2 (Ki 0.027 nM) and D4 (Ki 0.066 nM)) with weaker serotonin receptor antagonism (5-HT2A (Ki 3.75 nM)). In high doses, it has antihistaminergic and alpha-adrenergic properties. It possesses minimal anticholinergic properties.

Pharmacokinetics 
Benperidol is absorbed well and undergoes extensive first pass metabolism. One percent of benperidol is excreted in urine. The half-life of benperidol is 8 hours.

Synthesis

4-(2-Keto-1-benzimidazolinyl)piperidine [20662-53-7] (1) is alkylated with 4-Chloro-4'-Fluorobutyrophenone [3874-54-2] (2).

See also
Timiperone has a similar chemical structure with a thiourea group instead of a urea group.
Pimozide & Bezitramide (& Oxiperomide & Neflumozide) are also made from 4-(1-Benzimidazolinone)piperidine precursor
Droperidol is similar, but has a tetrahydropyridine ring.

References 

Belgian inventions
Benzimidazoles
Butyrophenone antipsychotics
Janssen Pharmaceutica
Fluoroarenes
Piperidines
Typical antipsychotics